Cheremshan River may refer to:
Bolshoy Cheremshan River
Maly Cheremshan River